Sir Walter Jackson Cooper, MBE (23 April 1888 – 22 July 1973) was an Australian politician who served as a Senator for Queensland for over 36 years. He served in the Senate from 1928 to 1932 and 1935 to 1968, representing the Country Party. He was also Minister for Repatriation in the Menzies Government from 1949 to 1960.

Early life
Cooper was born in Cheetham, Manchester and educated at Bedford School and Wyggeston Grammar School for Boys, Leicester.  He migrated to Western Australia in 1910 and later moved to Brisbane, Queensland.  In 1914, he established a property at Middleton, 200 km west of Winton.  During World War I, he enlisted in the first Australian Imperial Force and served at Gallipoli and Egypt.  In June 1916, he transferred to France and was wounded at the Battle of Mouquet Farm, requiring the amputation of a leg.  In February 1918, he married Louie Dorothy Marion Crick.  He was made a Member of the Order of the British Empire in 1919 and demobilised in 1921.  He later joined the Returned Sailors' and Soldiers' Imperial League of Australia (RSL).

Political career

Cooper was elected a Senator for Queensland at the 1928 election, representing the Country Party.  He was defeated at the 1931 election, his term ending in June 1932.  He was re-elected to the Senate at the 1934 election, his new term starting on 1 July 1935.  From 1947 to 1949, he was leader of the Opposition in the Senate.  Following the election of the Menzies government at the 1949 election, he led the Country Party in the Senate.  In 1949, he was appointed Minister for Repatriation and held that position until he resigned from the ministry in 1960.  In this position he worked closely with the RSL.  He was knighted in 1959 and retired from parliament in June 1968. From 1965 until his retirement, Cooper was the Father of the Senate. He served in the Senate for a total of 36 years, 227 days, making him the longest-serving member of parliament from Queensland, the second-longest-serving senator after George Pearce, and the second-longest-serving Country MP after Earle Page.

Cooper died at Repatriation General Hospital in the Brisbane suburb of Greenslopes, survived by his wife.  They had no children.

Notes

 

National Party of Australia members of the Parliament of Australia
Members of the Australian Senate for Queensland
Members of the Australian Senate
Members of the Cabinet of Australia
Australian Members of the Order of the British Empire
Australian Knights Bachelor
Australian politicians awarded knighthoods
People educated at Wyggeston Grammar School for Boys
1888 births
1973 deaths
People educated at Bedford School
20th-century Australian politicians
Australian amputees